The Ngamuwahine River is a river of the Bay of Plenty Region of New Zealand's North Island. Ngamuwahine Camp is also situated on the Ngumuwahine River. Ngamuwahine Camp is leased by Tauranga Intermediate which has its students sent to the camp in the beginning and end of each year.
Great swimming holes at the picnic site.

See also
List of rivers of New Zealand

References

Rivers of the Bay of Plenty Region
Rivers of New Zealand